The 2021–22 season was the seventh season in the existence of FC Nizhny Novgorod and the club's first season in the top flight of Russian football. In addition to the domestic league, FC Nizhny Novgorod participated in this season's editions of the Russian Cup, they was eliminated in round of sixteen.

Season events
On 16 March, Nizhny Novgorod suspended their contract with Lars Olden Larsen, and terminated their contract with Sylvester Igboun by mutual consent.

Players

Contacts suspended

Out on loan

Transfers

In

Loans in

Out

Loans out

Contract suspensions

Released

Friendlies

Competitions

Overview

Premier League

League table

Results summary

Results by round

Matches

Russian Cup

Group stage

Knockout stage

Squad statistics

Appearances and goals

|-
|colspan="14"|Players who suspended their contracts:

|-
|colspan="14"|Players away from the club on loan:

|-
|colspan="14"|Players who appeared for Nizhny Novgorod but left during the season:

|}

Goal scorers

Clean sheets

Disciplinary record

References

FC Nizhny Novgorod seasons
FC Nizhny Novgorod